La Poile Bay is a natural bay in Newfoundland, Canada, in the southwestern area of the island, off the south coast. It subdivides into Northeast Arm and North Bay. The settlement of La Poile is located on the bay.

References
 This article includes text incorporated from United States Hydrographic Office & R. G. Davenport's "Newfoundland and Labrador: The coast and banks of Newfoundland and the coast of Labrador, from Grand Point to the Koksoak River, with the adjacent islands and banks" (1884), a publication now in the public domain.

Bays of Newfoundland and Labrador